The Men's Javelin Throw event at the 2010 South American Games was held on March 23 at 18:15.

Medalists

Records

Results
Results were published.

Final

See also
2010 South American Under-23 Championships in Athletics

References

External links
Final

Javelin M